Masu Bhurgri is a Union council of Hyderabad Taluka (rural) in the Sindh province of Pakistan. It has a population of 24,300, and is located at 25°30'0N 68°28'0E to the north-east of the district capital Hyderabad.

Masu Bhurgri is named after a Baloch tribe, Bhurgari, who live in several locations around Pakistan.

The town has schools, hospitals and 100 shops. The most famous place of Masu Bhurgri is Masu wari Khad.

References

Hyderabad District, Pakistan
Union councils of Sindh